Commander in Chief (stylized as Tom Clancy Commander in Chief, Tom Clancy: Commander in Chief, or Tom Clancy’s Commander-in-Chief in the United Kingdom) is a political thriller novel, written by Mark Greaney and released on December 1, 2015. In the book, President Jack Ryan and The Campus must stop Russian president Valeri Volodin from launching a covert violent offensive in an effort to bring back Russia as a superpower. Commander in Chief is Greaney’s third solo entry in the Jack Ryan series, which is part of the overall Tom Clancy universe. The book debuted at number two on the New York Times bestseller list.

Plot
In Russia, the silovik, a group of military & intelligence officers and businessmen who basically control the country’s affairs, are concerned about the country’s economic decline. President Valeri Volodin brings up a plan of covert armed conflict within Europe that will ensure the restoration of Russia’s status as a superpower, while at the same time revamping its economy and benefiting the siloviki as a result. Privately however, Volodin tasks a financial expert, Andrei Limonov, with securing his assets worldwide in case his plan does not work.

Weeks later, a string of attacks plague most of Eastern Europe. A Lithuanian LNG tanker, the Independence, gets attacked by an eco-terrorist group. A Russian military train transporting men and materiel to Kaliningrad Oblast gets attacked by a Polish terrorist group, which gives Volodin an excuse to increase military presence in the region. Russian submarines begin attacking the Lithuanian Navy, and had torpedoed another oil tanker bound for Estonia. U.S. President Jack Ryan immediately notices a pattern in the recent attacks and the corresponding increase in Russia’s oil profit. He tries to recruit the North Atlantic Treaty Organization (NATO)’s help, but they decline, fearing the consequences of an all-out war. Frustrated, he later deploys the U.S. Navy to dispatch its Russian counterpart.

Meanwhile, Jack Ryan, Jr. is in Rome, Italy, investigating Russia’s money networks as well as spending time with his Iranian girlfriend Ysabel Kashani. He finds out about Limonov and moves to Luxembourg to follow up on his investigation, despite being followed by a paparazzo named Salvatore. Unbeknownst to him, the paparazzo had implanted a tracking device on Kashani's belongings, and the Iranian is later attacked by a group of men led by Russian hitman Yegor Morozov; they are dispatched by Ryan in the resulting altercation. Ysabel is later hospitalized.

Domingo “Ding” Chavez and Dominic “Dom” Caruso are tasked by Director of National Intelligence Mary Pat Foley to photograph specific locations along the Belarusian border. While there, they are asked to escort Pete Branyon, a local CIA station chief in Lithuania, to a meeting with some of his assets. During the meeting, Branyon gets kidnapped; Chavez and Caruso give chase and later rescue him. With help from Lithuanian intelligence director Linus Sabonis, they find out the identity of Branyon’s kidnappers as Serbs who posed as the Polish group that attacked the Russian train in Kaliningrad Oblast.

Distraught about what happened to his girlfriend, Ryan returns to the US and goes on his investigation into Limonov; he finds out that he is in the British Virgin Islands to meet with Terry Walker, inventor of the world’s largest Bitcoin exchange, to propose moving eight billion dollars for his client (implied to be Volodin) in and out of Bitcoin with a large commission. Campus operative John Clark is tasked with turning Walker, but finds out that Walker has been coerced into working with the Russians by kidnapping his wife and son, because he had turned down Limonov’s deal due to concern that the deal would draw too much attention to himself. Clark tries to save Walker’s family, but is ambushed by a group of men working for Kozlov, Limonov’s personal bodyguard. Clark was later rescued by Adara Sherman. Together, they rescue Walker and his family and capture Limonov, who later reveals Volodin’s frantic plan to move his assets.

Against orders, Ryan tracks down Salvatore to Brussels, Belgium (at the Stanhope hotel by Thon Hotels). Chavez and Caruso are redirected there to assist him. They find out that Salvatore is part of an eco-terrorist group that are preparing to attack a nearby oil and gas conference. They later dispatch the attackers, and find out that they are also responsible for the attack on the Independence. Meanwhile, a naval battle in the Baltic Sea results in victory for the U.S. and Polish navies over the Russian submarines, and the Russian advance into Lithuania is averted by the Swedish Air Force, who aid U.S. marines that are being pushed back by the Russian forces.

His diabolical plan in shambles, Volodin is later assassinated by the silovik. Ryan gets suspended from The Campus for not reporting Salvatore sooner and for not following orders.

Characters

United States government
 Jack Ryan: President of the United States
 Scott Adler: Secretary of state
 Mary Pat Foley: Director of national intelligence
 Robert "Bob" Burgess: Secretary of defense
 Jay Canfield: Director of the Central Intelligence Agency
 Dan Murray: Attorney general
 Arnold van Damm: President Ryan's chief of staff
 Peter Branyon: CIA chief of station, Vilnius, Lithuania
 Greg Donlin: CIA security officer

United States military
 Roland Hazelton: Admiral, chief of naval operations, United States Navy
 Scott Hagen: Commander, captain of the USS James Greer (DDG-102), United States Navy
 Phil Kincaid: Lieutenant commander, executive officer of USS James Greer (DDG-102), United States Navy
 Damon Hart: Lieutenant, weapons officer on USS James Greer (DDG-102), United States Navy
 Richard "Rich" Belanger: Lieutenant colonel, 3rd Battalion, 5th Marine Regiment, 1st Marine Division, United States Marine Corps; battalion commander of the Black Sea Rotational Force

The Campus
 Gerry Hendley: Director, The Campus/Hendley Associates
 John Clark: Director of operations
 Domingo "Ding" Chavez: Senior operations officer
 Dominic "Dom" Caruso: Operations officer
 Jack Ryan, Jr.: Operations officer/analyst
 Gavin Biery: Director of information technology
 Adara Sherman: Director of transportation

The Russians
 Valeri Volodin: President of the Russian Federation
 Mikhail "Misha" Grankin: Director of the Kremlin Security Council (Russian intelligence)
 Arkady Diburov: Chairman of the board of directors of Gazprom, Russian natural gas company
 Andrei Limonov (Mr. Ivanov): Russian private equity manager
 Vlad Kozlov (Mr. Popov): Intelligence operative in the kremlin Security Council
 Yegor Morozov: Intelligence operative in the Kremlin Security council
 Tatiana Molchanova: Television newscaster, Novorissiya (Channel Seven)

Other characters
 Martina Jaeger: Dutch contract killer
 Braam Jaeger: Dutch contract killer
 Terry Walker: President and CEO of BlackHole Bitcoin Exchange, cryptocurrency trader
 Kate Walker: Wife of Terry Walker
 Noah Walker: Son of Terry Walker
 Eglé Banyté: President of Lithuania
 Marion Schöngarth: Chancellor of the Federal Republic of Germany
 Salvatore: Italian paparazzo
 Christine von Langer: Former CIA case officer
 Herkus Zarkus: Lithuanian fiber-optic network technician; Land Force soldier
 Linus Sabonis: Director, Lithuanian State Security Department

Development
In addition, the naval battle in the Baltic Sea, which is depicted in Commander in Chief, paid homage to Tom Clancy's debut novel The Hunt for Red October; Greaney said about the experience: "Tom did it so well; it just didn’t need to be redone, especially by a follow-on author, but the advances in submarines and anti-submarine warfare over the past few years just made it really interesting. I framed it as, 'OK, you’re not going down into the submarine like Tom did. This is anti-submarine warfare, and they are the sharks in the water. The Americans have to go find them.'"

Reception

Commercial
The novel debuted at number two on both the Combined Print & E-Book Fiction and Hardcover Fiction categories of the New York Times bestseller list for the week of December 20, 2015. In addition, it debuted at number five on the USA Today Best Selling Books list for the week of December 10, 2015.

A year later, the paperback edition of the book peaked at number five on the Paperback Mass-Market Fiction category of the New York Times bestseller list and stayed in the chart for eight weeks.

Critical
Commander in Chief enjoyed generally positive reviews. Publishers Weekly praised Greaney, who "manages it without being boring", which "shows that he's well qualified to continue the adventures of Jack Ryan and son"; they concluded that "In the best tradition of Clancy, Greaney capably lays out the groundwork for these machinations before setting them all in entertaining motion. Fans of military action thrillers will be well satisfied." Thriller novel reviewer The Real Book Spy lauded the book, saying that "The hallmark of a good thriller is that it’s exciting and fast. Greaney seems to embrace that style, and it works really well here."

References

2015 American novels
Political thriller novels
Techno-thriller novels
American thriller novels
Ryanverse
Novels set in Lithuania
Novels set in Italy
Novels set in Belgium
Novels set in Europe
G. P. Putnam's Sons books